A Hobson's choice is a free choice in which only one thing is actually offered. The term is often used to describe an illusion that multiple choices are available. The most well known Hobson's choice is "I'll give you a choice: take it or leave it", wherein "leaving it" is strongly undesirable.

The phrase is said to have originated with Thomas Hobson (1544–1631), a livery stable owner in Cambridge, England, who offered customers the choice of either taking the horse in his stall nearest to the door or taking none at all.

Origins

According to a plaque underneath a painting of Hobson donated to Cambridge Guildhall, Hobson had an extensive stable of some 40 horses. This gave the appearance to his customers that, upon entry, they would have their choice of mounts, when in fact there was only one: Hobson required his customers to take the horse in the stall closest to the door. This was to prevent the best horses from always being chosen, which would have caused those horses to become overused. Hobson's stable was located on land that is now owned by St Catharine's College, Cambridge.

Early appearances in writing
According to the Oxford English Dictionary, the first known written usage of this phrase is in The rustick's alarm to the Rabbies, written by Samuel Fisher in 1660:

It also appears in Joseph Addison's paper The Spectator (No. 509 of 14 October 1712); and in Thomas Ward's 1688 poem "England's Reformation", not published until after Ward's death. Ward wrote:

Modern use
The term "Hobson's choice" is often used to mean an illusion of choice, but it is not a choice between two equivalent options, which is a Morton's fork, nor is it a choice between two undesirable options, which is a dilemma. Hobson's choice is one between something or nothing.

John Stuart Mill, in his book Considerations on Representative Government, refers to Hobson's choice:

In another of his books, The Subjection of Women, Mill discusses marriage:

A Hobson's choice is different from:
 Dilemma: a choice between two or more options, none of which are attractive.
 False dilemma: only certain choices are considered, when in fact there are others.
 Catch-22: a logical paradox arising from a situation in which an individual needs something that can only be acquired by not being in that very situation.
 Morton's fork, and a double bind: choices yield equivalent and, often, undesirable results.
 Blackmail and extortion: the choice between paying money (or some non-monetary good or deed) or risk suffering an unpleasant action.

A common error is to use the phrase "Hobbesian choice" instead of "Hobson's choice", confusing the philosopher Thomas Hobbes with the relatively obscure Thomas Hobson. (It is possible the confusion is between "Hobson's choice" and a "Hobbesian trap", which refers to the situation in which a state attacks another out of fear.)

Common law

In Immigration and Naturalization Service v. Chadha (1983), Justice Byron White dissented and classified the majority's decision to strike down the "one-house veto" as unconstitutional as leaving Congress with a Hobson's choice. Congress may choose between "refrain[ing] from delegating the necessary authority, leaving itself with a hopeless task of writing laws with the requisite specificity to cover endless special circumstances across the entire policy landscape, or in the alternative, to abdicate its lawmaking function to the executive branch and independent agency".

In Philadelphia v. New Jersey, 437 U.S. 617 (1978), the majority opinion ruled that a New Jersey law which prohibited the importation of solid or liquid waste from other states into New Jersey was unconstitutional based on the Commerce Clause. The majority reasoned that New Jersey cannot discriminate between the intrastate waste and the interstate waste without due justification. In dissent, Justice Rehnquist stated:

In Monell v. Department of Social Services of the City of New York, 436 U.S. 658 (1978) the judgement of the court was that

In the South African Constitutional Case MEC for Education, Kwa-Zulu Natal and Others v Pillay, 2008 (1) SA 474 (CC) Chief Justice Langa for the majority of the Court (in Paragraph 62 of the judgement) writes that:

 
In Epic Systems Corp. v. Lewis (2018), Justice Ruth Bader Ginsburg dissented and added in one of the footnotes that the petitioners "faced a Hobson’s choice: accept arbitration on their employer’s terms or give up their jobs".

In 

In Meriwether v. Hartop, the court addressed the university's offer, "Don’t use any pronouns or sex-based terms at all." It wrote, "The effect of this Hobson’s Choice is that Meriwether must adhere to the university’s orthodoxy (or face punishment). This is coercion, at the very least of the indirect sort."

In popular culture 
Film and Television
 Hobson's Choice (play), by Harold Brighouse (1915), which has been adapted numerous times:
 Hobson's Choice (1920 film), a silent film directed by Percy Nash
 Hobson's Choice (1931 film), directed by Thomas Bentley
 Hobson's Choice (1954 film), directed by David Lean
 Walking Happy, a 1966 Broadway musical by Jimmy Van Heusen
 Hobson's Choice, a 1983 television-movie directed by Gilbert Cates
 Hobson's Choice, a 1989 ballet by David Bintley directed by David Lean

Literature
 "Hobson's Choice", a 1952 short story written by Alfred Bester
 The Terminal Experiment, a 1995 science fiction novel originally serialized under the title Hobson's Choice

See also

 Any Colour You Like
 Buckley's chance
 Buridan's ass
 Boulwarism
 Choice architecture
 Locus of control
 Morton's fork
 No-win situation
 Sophie's choice
 Standard form contract
 Zugzwang

References

External links
 

English-language idioms
Free will
Metaphors referring to people
Dilemmas